Ismael Ignacio Fuentes Castro (born 4 August 1981) is a Chilean former footballer who played as centre back.

Club career
Fuentes made his debut with Deportes Linares in the Primera B de Chile and then he moved to Rangers in 2001.

International career
Fuentes represented Chile at under-20 level in the 2001 South American Championship. At senior level, he made 30 appearances and scored one goal between 2004 and 2010.

International goals

Honours

Club
Universidad Católica
 Primera División de Chile (1): 2010

References

External links
 

1981 births
Living people
People from Linares Province
Chilean footballers
Chilean expatriate footballers
Chile international footballers
Chile under-20 international footballers
Deportes Linares footballers
Rangers de Talca footballers
Colo-Colo footballers
Atlas F.C. footballers
Chiapas F.C. footballers
Club Deportivo Universidad Católica footballers
Correcaminos UAT footballers
C.D. Antofagasta footballers
Santos de Guápiles footballers
Coquimbo Unido footballers
Primera B de Chile players
Chilean Primera División players
Liga MX players
Ascenso MX players
Liga FPD players
Chilean expatriate sportspeople in Mexico
Chilean expatriate sportspeople in Costa Rica
Expatriate footballers in Mexico
Expatriate footballers in Costa Rica
2004 Copa América players
2007 Copa América players
2010 FIFA World Cup players
Association football defenders